Irineau Silvio Wilges (3 October 1936 – 17 November 2022) was a Brazilian Roman Catholic prelate.

Wilges was born in Brazil and was ordained to the priesthood in 1962. He served as the bishop of the Roman Catholic Diocese of Cachoeira do Sul, Brazil, from 2000 until his retirement in 2011.

References

1936 births
2022 deaths
Brazilian Roman Catholic bishops
21st-century Roman Catholic bishops
Bishops appointed by Pope John Paul II
People from Rio de Janeiro (state)